Rank and File was an American country rock band established in 1981 in Austin, Texas by Chip Kinman and Tony Kinman, a pair of brothers who had been members of the seminal California punk rock band The Dils. The band were forerunners in combining the musical rawness and Do It Yourself punk aesthetic with the style and ambience of country and western music, helping to create a subgenre known as cowpunk. After releasing three albums, the band terminated in 1987.

History

Formation
In 1981, the brothers Chip and Tony Kinman split up their influential political punk band The Dils, based in Carlsbad, California, and departed for the East. After a brief time in New York City, the brothers landed in the musical mecca of Austin, Texas, to start a new band. There they joined forces with guitarist Alejandro Escovedo of The Nuns to form Rank and File. Chip Kinman also played guitar while Tony was on bass. The drummer was Slim Evans.

Chip Kinman later recalled the difficulty the band had at the time of its launch, during which "people were grossed out" by the band's heavy-on-the-country, light-on the punk sound. "We'd go into New Wave clubs, and no one was playing country music. We'd play those songs, and we'd never get asked back," Kinman remembered.

Recording history
Rank and File released three albums—two on prominent Los Angeles label Slash Records and a third on the offbeat, retro-oriented Rhino Records.

The band's debut album, Sundown, was released in June 1982 on Slash Records.

Their second album, 1984's Long Gone Dead, included a cover version of a tune by Lefty Frizzell, and made use of traditional country instrumentation such as a steel guitar and fiddle. Chicago Tribune music critic Tom Popson emphasized the band's employment of "a lot of Johnny Cash-style rockabilly guitar lines" as part of that particular project. Jeff Ross was the other guitarist on this album. He had replaced Junior Brown, who appeared on stage with Rank and File but did not feature on any recordings.

The band's third and final release, the eponymous album Rank and File on Rhino Records, introduced Bobby Kahr on drums, replacing Evans. Released in 1987, it marked a move from traditional country to more pop-oriented country-tinged fare, which the band deemed "a little easier for the normal person to pick up on".

In 2006, Tony Kinman discussed how the delay in recording the third album damaged Rank and File's career and caused them to lose their desire. "That’s basically why that third album sounds like it does, heavy metal and hard rock or something," he said. "It’s just wrong." The band broke up soon afterward.

Stylistic trendsetters
While continuing to espouse their personal political views, the Kinmans saw their new band as a more entertaining departure from the intensity of hardcore punk, embracing the sound and cultural ambience of country music, albeit with a post-punk spin. In a 1986 interview with Flipside magazine, bassist Tony Kinman emphasized the band's willingness to shatter stylistic preconceptions to become trendsetters:

"We're brave, we're not afraid to do stuff, most people are. They're deathly afraid to do anything different. ... [W]hen everybody else was talking about how stupid country music was, country music was the last thing to like, if you wore a cowboy hat you were a redneck, you know, we decided go say, 'Yeah, we play country music, it's fun.'

"Up in San Francisco, KUSF Wave, their magazine, did the first review Rank and File ever got, live review. They said we sucked, and then they said, 'What are these guys trying to do, start a trend?' Well, that's the way it worked out, but only because we were brave enough and smart enough to do it first. That's how you get to be influential—if you're brave enough to do something different and you're smart enough to do it right. Otherwise you're just another dumb-ass band."

The band appeared on PBS's nationally broadcast country showcase Austin City Limits.

Later projects
The Kinmans' next project was the synthpop, guitar and drum-machine based, Blackbird. They would return to the cowpunk subgenre with another band, a minimalistic three-piece band called Cowboy Nation that released its debut album in January 1997 on Shock Records from Australia.
In 2018, The Kinman brothers reunited for Chip's new band Ford Madox Ford. Released by Porterhouse Records, Ford Madox Ford's debut album, This American Blues, featured Chip on vocals and guitar, Matt Littell on bass, S. Scott Aguero on drums, Dewey Peak on lead guitar and Tony Kinman as producer.

Alejandro Escovedo formed the True Believers with his brother Javier, before launching a solo songwriting and recording career.

Tony Kinman died on May 4, 2018.

Discography
 Sundown, Slash Records, 1982
 Long Gone Dead, Slash Records, 1984
 Rank and File, Rhino Records, 1987

References

External links
 Alan Thicke, "Rank and File: Interview", Thicke of the Night, 1983. —Video.

Musical groups established in 1981
Musical groups disestablished in 1987
1981 establishments in Texas
1987 disestablishments in Texas
American new wave musical groups
Cowpunk musical groups
Musical groups from Austin, Texas
Slash Records artists